The Logan metropolitan area is the metropolitan area encompassing Logan, Utah, United States.

The Logan metropolitan area may refer to:
The Logan, West Virginia micropolitan area, United States

See also
Logan (disambiguation)